László Hoffmann (born 29 June 1958, in Tét) is a Hungarian former handball goalkeeper.  He participated on three World Championships between 1982 and 1990 and won the silver medal in 1986. He also played on the 1988 Summer Olympics, where the Hungarian national team placed fourth.

Awards
 Hungarian Handballer of the Year: 1984

References

1958 births
Living people
People from Tés
Hungarian male handball players
Olympic handball players of Hungary
Handball players at the 1988 Summer Olympics
Sportspeople from Veszprém County